The Religious of Jesus and Mary, abbreviated as R.J.M., form a Roman Catholic religious congregation of women dedicated to the education and service of the poor. It was founded at Lyon, France, in October 1818, by Claudine Thévenet.

Foundation

Thévenet had survived the siege of her native city by the forces of the French Revolution, seeing two of her brothers executed before her eyes in 1794. This inspired a resolve in her to dedicate her life to the relief of the suffering in the world. Some 20 years later, her work came to be guided by a local Catholic priest, the Abbé André Coindre, who was committed to establishing institutions to educate and help the children of the poor in the city. One day he committed to her care two young girls who had been found abandoned near the Church of St-Nizier.

Thévenet then established a small house of refuge called La Providence to care for the children of the city. She was joined in this work by a group of women who formed a society, of which she was elected president. In 1818 Coindre suggested to her that she should commit herself to the consecrated life under Ignatian spirituality, which call she accepted. With the members of the society she had founded who also wished to follow that path, she established a small convent in the working-class neighborhood of La Croix-Rousse. They soon need to expand and moved to a house in the Fourvière sector of the city.

Growth
The congregation received the approval of the Bishop of Le Puy-en-Velay in 1823 and of the Archbishop of Lyon in 1825. Their Constitutions were approved by Pope Pius IX on 31 December 1847. The object of this congregation was to give girls a Christian education conformable to their social position. For this purpose the Sister would have boarding schools and academies.

In France, before the expulsion of 1901, they were at Lyon, and at Le Puy-en-Velay, Rodez, and Remiremont. Owing to the religious persecution in France at that time, the General Motherhouse was transferred to Rome in September 1901.

Beyond France
In 1842, Lyons sent a community of Sisters to India, where 12 communities were established, including ones at Bombay, Poona, Lahore, Simla and Agra (see Convent of Jesus and Mary). In 1850, the first house in Spain was founded at Sant Andreu de Palomar near Barcelona; then followed other foundations, at Valencia, Barcelona, Orihuela, Sant Gervasi, Alicante and Murcia. In 1902, Spain sent a colony to found houses in Mexico City and at Mérida, Yucatán.

The Americas
The first house of the congregation in the Americas was founded at St-Joseph, Lévis, Quebec, Canada, in 1855. In 1876, Sillery, Quebec, became the Provincial motherhouse for America. Canada has four other houses, at St-Gervais, St-Michel, Trois-Pistoles, and Beauceville.

By the middle of the 19th century, poor harvests sent many French Canadians to emigrate south to find work in the industrialized towns of the United States. In 1877, several Sisters left Sillery to open houses in the United States. The first foundation was that at Fall River, Massachusetts. The house at Manchester, New Hampshire, was founded in 1881; then, at Woonsocket, Rhode Island, a boarding school and two parochial schools (1884). At Providence, the religious set up a convent and two parochial schools. 

In 1902, several Sisters left the motherhouse in Rome, to establish the congregation in New York City, opening a residence for young working women in lower Manhattan. The foundation of a young ladies' academy at Kingsbridge in the northwest Bronx quickly developed into a century of service at St. John's Parish and School where more than 200 Sisters of Jesus and Mary dedicated countless years of educational service to thousands of local Catholic boys and girls. Notable educators among the Sisters were Mother Mary Catherine Kenny, Mother Camillus and Mother Regis.

In the Southwestern United States, Religious of Jesus and Mary who had been expelled from Mexico due to the repression of the Catholic Church there during the early 20th century began to settle and open new centers of service.

In 1938, Bishop Buddy welcomed the sisters to San Diego, wanting them to open an affordable residence for working women, similar to one they operated in El Paso, Texas.  Until its closure in 2022, sisters from the Religious of Jesus and Mary operated Joan of Arc Residence, located at 1510 Third Avenue in Downtown San Diego, CA.  It was a three-story residential facility that offered 60 housing units for underprivileged, single, working women for nearly 85 years.

Current status
Today 1,300 Religious of Jesus and Mary serve in 28 countries around the world. They are supported in their work by over 1,600 associates, who form the Family of Jesus and Mary.

Notable members
 Saint Claudine Thévenet
 Blessed Dina Bélanger

See also
 Convent of Jesus and Mary
 Jesus Marie Convent (Fall River, Massachusetts)

References

External links 

Attribution

Catholic female orders and societies
Catholic teaching orders
Catholic religious institutes established in the 19th century
1818 establishments in France
Women's congregations following Ignatian spirituality